Hessen is a Sachsen-class frigate of the German Navy.

Construction and commissioning
Built by Nordseewerke, Emden, Hessen was the third and final ship of the Sachsen class to be launched and then commissioned into the German Navy. She is based at Wilhelmshaven with the other ships of the Sachsen class as part of 2. Fregattengeschwader, which itself forms part of the Einsatzflottille 2.

Service
Shortly after her commissioning in 2006, Hessen was deployed with other ships of the German Navy to guard the Mecklenburg coastline during the 33rd G8 summit in 2007, which was being held in the region. In 2008 she was part of the Maritime Task Force deployed in support of the United Nations Interim Force in Lebanon. In March the following year she was part of the  combat group. In June the Hessen transited the Suez Canal with the US force and deployed with the US Fifth Fleet.

From January to June 2013 Hessen was part of Standing NATO Maritime Group 1, as the flagship of Flotilla Admiral Georg von Maltzan. She also participated in Operation Active Endeavour during this period. From December 2013 to April 2014, Hessen was deployed with EUNAVFOR in Operation Atalanta, tackling piracy off the coast of Somalia. From May to June 2015, Hessen deployed in the Mediterranean alongside the replenishment ship Berlin. Together the two vessels saved several hundred migrants from shipwrecks and other incidents.

In 2017 Hessen was responsible for securing the airspace at the G20 summit in Hamburg. On 28 January 2018 Hessen arrived at Naval Station Norfolk. She and the Norwegian frigate HNoMS Roald Amundsen took part in Composite Training Unit Exercises with the aircraft carrier USS Harry S. Truman, after which Hessen accompanied the combat group on the first half of its deployment to the Mediterranean. In October 2022, Hessen was assigned to the Carrier Strike Group of the aircraft carrier  for the carrier's maiden deployment.

References

Sachsen-class frigates
2003 ships
Ships built in Emden
Frigates of Germany